The men's team competition at the 2002 Asian Games in Busan was held on 11 October 2002.

Schedule
All times are Korea Standard Time (UTC+09:00)

Results

References 

2002 Asian Games Official Report, Pages 488–500

External links 
Results

Modern pentathlon at the 2002 Asian Games